Sharad Pawar broke away in 1978 from Government of Maharashtra led by Vasantdada Patil of Indian National Congress, formed the Indian National Congress (Socialist), allied with the Janata party and the Peasants' and Workers' Party of India (PWP) to form a coalition government of the Progressive Democratic Front (PDF) or Purogami Lokshahi Aghadi. The Progressive Democratic Front government was sworn in on 18 July 1978. This government was dismissed on 18 February 1980 following Indira Gandhi's return to power at the Centre.

Cabinet Ministers

Ministers of State

References

1978 in Indian politics
Pawar 01
Janata Party
Peasants' and Workers' Party of India
Indian National Congress (Socialist)
1978 establishments in Maharashtra
1980 disestablishments in India
Cabinets established in 1978
Cabinets disestablished in 1980